The American Gangster is a 1992 American crime documentary film directed by Ben Burtt and written and produced by Ray Herbeck Jr.  The documentary is narrated by Dennis Farina and explores the lives of America's gangsters such as Pretty Boy Floyd, John Dillinger, Al Capone, and Bugsy Siegel.  It was directly released on VHS in 1992 and later released as part of a DVD box set in 2006.

Background
The American Gangster is a documentary that chronicles the formation of the first generation of American gangsters.  The documentary explores the illegal businesses involving gambling, prostitution, and defiance of the prohibition of alcohol that empowered the gangsters.  The documentary shows actual film footage and photographs of gangsters like Pretty Boy Floyd, John Dillinger, Al Capone, and Bugsy Siegel.

Release
The American Gangster was released on VHS on July 1, 1992.  The documentary was later part of a box set of DVDs, The Mob Box Set, released on January 3, 2006.  The documentary accompanied films like Bugsy (1991), Donnie Brasco (1997), and Snatch (2000).

References

External links

 

1992 films
1990s English-language films
Documentary films about organized crime in the United States
1992 documentary films
Films directed by Ben Burtt
Works about Depression-era gangsters
John Dillinger
Al Capone
1990s American films